The 2020 Big East men's basketball tournament was the postseason tournament men's basketball tournament for the Big East Conference. It was to have been held from March 11 through March 14, 2020, at Madison Square Garden in New York City, and the two first-round games were played on March 11.

Early on March 12, amid concerns over the spreading COVID-19 pandemic in the United States, the Big East Conference issued a statement that it would limit attendance during the rest of the tournament to student-athletes, coaches, team staff, event staff, essential media, and immediate family members  The first quarterfinal game, with Creighton facing St. John's, began on March 12, but during halftime, with St. John's leading 38–35, the Big East Conference cancelled the rest of the game and all remaining tournament games in order to further reduce the possibility of spreading the SARS-CoV-2 virus responsible for cases of COVID-19. It was the first cancellation of the tournament since its foundation in 1980. Despite the cancellation of the tournament, the conference was able to receive an insurance payout of $10.5 million as a result of the tournament's insurance policy.

The winner was to have received the conference's bid to the 2020 NCAA tournament, which also was cancelled on March 12, 2020.

Seeds
All 10 Big East schools were slated to participate in the tournament. Teams were seeded by the conference record with tie-breaking procedures to determine the seeds for teams with identical conference records. The top six teams received first-round byes. Seeding for the tournament was determined at the close of the regular conference season.

Schedule

Bracket

See also
2020 Big East women's basketball tournament

References

Tournament
Big East men's basketball tournament
Big East men's basketball tournament
Basketball competitions in New York City
College sports tournaments in New York City
Sports in Manhattan
Big East men's basketball tournament
Big East men's basketball tournament
2020s in Manhattan